Auburn is an antebellum mansion in Duncan Park in Natchez, Mississippi. It was designed and constructed by Levi Weeks in 1812, and was the first building to exhibit Greek Revival order in the town.  Its prominent two-story Greek portico served as a model for the subsequent architectural development of local mansions.  It was declared a National Historic Landmark in 1974 and a Mississippi Landmark in 1984.

Description
Auburn is a two-story brick building, with a central core and flanking symmetrical wings.  A four-column temple front adorns the center of the block, with modified Ionic columns supporting an entablature and fully pedimented gable.  The gable has modillioned cornices and an oval window at its center. The main entrance is set in a segmented-arch opening along with flanking sidelight windows and a transom window above.  Sheltered by the temple portico is a second floor balcony, which is accessed via a doorway that is only slightly less elaborate than the main entry.

History
In 1811, Lyman Harding, the first Attorney General of Mississippi, hired Levi Weeks, a young architect, to design and build the mansion. Levi Weeks designed the house to be, in his words, the "most magnificent building in the state."

After Harding died in 1820, the building was bought by Dr. Stephen Duncan, who expanded the house to include two symmetrical wings, greatly expanding interior space. Duncan later abandoned the building amidst growing secession tensions just before the American Civil War, and the house was placed in the care of his descendants.

The grounds were converted by the City of Natchez into Duncan Park.

See also
List of National Historic Landmarks in Mississippi
National Register of Historic Places listings in Adams County, Mississippi

References

External links

Historic house museums in Mississippi
Museums in Natchez, Mississippi
National Historic Landmarks in Mississippi
Houses in Natchez, Mississippi
Houses completed in 1812
Antebellum architecture
Greek Revival houses in Mississippi
Mississippi Landmarks
Historic American Buildings Survey in Mississippi
National Register of Historic Places in Natchez, Mississippi